Dusty Roads may refer to:

 "Dusty Roads", song by ASG from Feeling Good Is Good Enough
 "Dusty Roads", song by Irwin Chusid from Songs in the Key of Z
 "Dusty Roads", song by Downhere from Downhere
 "Dusty Roads", song by Honey Ltd. as Eve, Marsha Temmer & Laura Polkinghorne 1970
 "Dusty Roads", song by B. J. Thomas, written Chips Moman 1978
 The Dusty Roads EP, by Jinder
 Dusty Rhodes, album by John Holt

See also
Dusty Rhodes (disambiguation)